Sonning Bridge is a road bridge across the River Thames at Sonning, Berkshire. It links Sonning with Sonning Eye (Oxfordshire) and crosses the Thames on the reach above Shiplake Lock, just short of Sonning Lock. It is a brick arch bridge completed in 1775, to replace an earlier wooden bridge. The bridge has been the subject of many paintings and prints by artists and is a Grade II listed building.
 
The road extends to the two Sonning Backwater Bridges. One is over the backwater downstream of the weir and the other is over the millrace which is between the two main branches.

The Thames Path crosses the river at this point.

History
The earliest definite reference to a "timber" bridge is around 1530, although there are claims that there was a wooden old Saxon bridge here before 1125. It was spoken of as being rebuilt in 1604, although throughout the 17th century there are reports of decay and the need for repair.

A stone marker at the centre of the bridge is marked "B | O" (for the counties of Berkshire and Oxfordshire on each side of the river) with the vertical line indicating the exact boundary down the middle of the river. This is an ancient border which used to be between Wessex and Mercia.

The wooden backwater bridges were not replaced until the 20th century. At the beginning of the 20th century, there were complaints about the traction engines causing structural problems with the old wooden backwater bridges and disturbing the peace. In 2013 the frontage of a letterbox was placed on the downstream side of one of the supporting buttresses of the bridge by the artist Impro. The position of the box meant that if it had been functional it would only have been accessible to users on the river itself.

It is rumoured that Dick Turpin used the bridge as an escape route from Berkshire to Oxfordshire to evade the authorities.

Traffic
Sonning Bridge has traffic lights because it is too narrow for traffic in both directions simultaneously. It is the only road bridge across the Thames between Henley-on-Thames and Reading. Thus there are large queues during the morning and evening rush hours. An additional bridge to relieve the traffic problems has been a subject of debate for many years. As at October 2019, Transport for South East (TfSE) had presented to the Department for Transport requesting funding for the creation of a full business case in support of a proposed third bridge. The proposed scheme is currently in second place on a list of Large Local Major projects for TfSE.

Adjacent buildings

Close to the bridge are the Great House, a hotel on the southern bank, the Mill at Sonning, now a theatre, on an island between two branches of the river, and the French Horn, another hotel on the northern bank.

See also

 Sonning Backwater Bridges
 Crossings of the River Thames

References

External links
 Images of Sonning Bridge from Google
 
 Website with a picture

Bridges in Berkshire
Bridges in Oxfordshire
Deck arch bridges
Bridges across the River Thames
Bridge
Stone bridges in the United Kingdom
Bridges completed in 1775
Grade II listed bridges
Grade II listed buildings in Berkshire
Road bridges in England